Trailer Park Tycoon is a business simulation game for Windows.

Gameplay
Trailer Park Tycoon puts the player in the shoes of a budding trailer park owner.

The player is tasked with building various trailers and amenities to attract people to their park. They will start with five to eight basic trailers, each upgradable three times. Specialized trailers become available, catering to specific people. A trailer in the theme of a car, for example, will attract garage workers, while a biker themed trailer will attract bikers. The game is now out of print since its developers have gone out of business.

Reception

Reviews for the game had mostly been mixed, with the game currently holding an average score of 55.67% on GameRankings.

References

External links

Trailer Park Tycoon at GameFAQs

Business simulation games
North America-exclusive video games
Video games developed in the United States
Windows games
Windows-only games
2002 video games
Jaleco games
Single-player video games